"Wesley Marsh" was also a pseudonym used by Murray Boltinoff.

Wesley Marsh (born November 3, 1961) is a former member of the Arizona House of Representatives. He served in the House from January 1995 through January 2003, serving district 28. Not eligible to run for the House in 2002, due to Arizona term limit laws, he ran for the State Senate in the newly redistricted District 7, but lost in the Republican primary to Jim Waring.  Having not served in the house in the prior term, he was once again eligible to run for the house in 2004, and ran in District 7, but lost in the Republican primary to Ray Barnes and David Burnell Smith.

References

Republican Party members of the Arizona House of Representatives
1961 births
Living people